Newport City is a 25-hectare (62-acre) township development situated next to the Villamor golf course and Terminal 3 of the Ninoy Aquino International Airport (NAIA) in Metro Manila, Philippines. Awarded as the Mixed-Use Development of the Year by the Philippine Retailers Association in 2015, Newport City is a Megaworld Corporation township development and is designed to combine accommodations and entertainment with residences, hotels, a mall and Resorts World Manila, the country's first fully integrated entertainment complex.

Newport Mall

Newport Mall is a lifestyle mall development of Megaworld Lifestyle Malls located inside Resorts World Manila complex in Newport City, Pasay.

It also specializes in restaurants.

For entertainment, Newport Mall offers 24-hour weekend movie screening in its four cinemas.

Newport Performing Arts Theater 

Newport Mall is home to the Newport Performing Arts Theater (NPAT). The 1,500-seater NPAT has hosted productions such as KAOS, The Sound of Music, The King and I, Cinderella, Priscilla, Chitty Chitty Bang Bang, Ang Huling El Bimbo and is home to TV singing competition The Voice of the Philippines.

Gallery

See also
Resorts World Manila
Villamor Airbase

References

Mixed-use developments in Metro Manila
Entertainment districts in the Philippines
Planned communities in the Philippines
Pasay